"Ocean" (stylized as "OCEAN") is the 37th Japanese single by South Korean pop duo Tohoshinki. It was released on June 12, 2013 by Avex Trax as the first single from their seventh Japanese studio album, Tree (2014). Written and produced by Shinjiroh Inoue, "Ocean" was released in three editions – a CD+DVD version, a CD-only version, and a Bigeast Board edition.

The single sold 88,428 copies on its first day of release, and 116,782 copies by its second, breaking a new record for the group. "Ocean" landed at number two on the weekly Oricon Singles Chart by selling 140,872 copies, and was certified gold by the Recording Industry Association of Japan (RIAJ). Charting for over nine months, "Ocean" has reported sales of 159,163 according to the Oricon.

"Ocean" was used as the June monthly theme song for five different Japanese variety shows, which include the daytime show PON!, the music show Music Dragon (ミュージックドラゴン), the game show Sore Ike! Game Panther! (それいけ!ゲームパンサー!), and Futtonda (フットンダ). The B-side track "Wedding Dress", written by Shirose and Shimada of White Jam, was used as the theme song for BeeTV's mobile drama, The Greatest Proposal (最上のプロポーズ).

Formats and track listings
iTunes digital download
 "OCEAN" – 5:14
 "Wedding Dress" – 4:26
 "OCEAN" (music video)

CD+DVD single AVCK-79145
Disc 1 (CD)
 "OCEAN"
 "Wedding Dress"
 "OCEAN" (Less Vocal)
 "Wedding Dress" (Less Vocal)
Disc 2 (DVD)
 "OCEAN" (Video Clip)
 "OCEAN" (Off Shot Movie)

CD single AVCK-79147
 "OCEAN"
 "Wedding Dress"
 "OCEAN" (Rising Starr Remix)
 "OCEAN" (Less Vocal)
 "Wedding Dress" (Less Vocal)

Charts

Oricon charts

Billboard Japan charts

Other charts

Certifications

Release history

References

External links

TVXQ songs
2013 singles
Japanese-language songs